is a Japanese astronomer with the Kiso Observatory. He is best known for helping to popularize astronomy in Japan and for his observations of comets and asteroids, most notably with his co-discovery the comet 1976 XVI. He is credited by the Minor Planet Center (MPC) with the discovery of nearly 100 asteroids.

Awards and honors 

Asteroid 3370 Kohsai, discovered by Karl Reinmuth at Heidelberg Observatory in 1930, was is named in his honor. The official naming citation was published by the MPC on 14 April 1987.

List of discovered minor planets 

Hiroki Kosai discovered several asteroids, all in collaboration with  Kiichirō Furukawa and  Goro Sasaki:

See also

References

External links 
 Activities of Asteroid Studies by Amateur Astronomers in Japan
 2008 Great Meeting at Nikon Headquarters

1933 births
Discoverers of asteroids

20th-century Japanese astronomers
Living people
People from Kurashiki